Two ships of the United States Navy have borne the name USS Runner, named for the runner, an amberfish inhabiting subtropical waters, so called for its rapid leaps from the water.  

United States Navy ship names